The Port of Taicang North Port Expressway, designated S80, is a  provincial expressway in the county-level city of Taicang, Jiangsu, China that connects the G15 Shenyang–Haikou Expressway, a major north-south expressway running through the city, with the Port of Taicang. It is one of two expressways that connect the port with the rest of the expressway network, the other one being the S81 Port of Taicang South Port Expressway. It opened on 8 October 2013.

References 

Expressways in Jiangsu